Charles Ferdinand Ramuz (24 September 1878 – 23 May 1947) was a French-speaking Swiss writer.

Biography

He was born in Lausanne in the canton of Vaud and was educated at the University of Lausanne. He taught briefly in nearby Aubonne, and then in Weimar, Germany. In 1903, he left for Paris and remained there until World War I, with frequent trips home to Switzerland. As part of his studies in Paris he wrote a thesis on the poet Maurice de Guérin. In 1903, he published Le petit village, a collection of poems.

In 1914, he returned to Switzerland.

He wrote the libretto for Igor Stravinsky's Histoire du soldat.

He died in Pully, near Lausanne in 1947. His likeness and an artistic impression of his works appear on the 200 Swiss franc note (no longer in current use).

The Foundation C.F. Ramuz in Pully awards the Grand Prix C. F. Ramuz.

Works

Le petit village (1903)
Aline (1905)
Jean-Luc persécuté (1909)
Aimé Pache, peintre vaudois (1911)
Vie de Samuel Belet (1913)
Raison d'être (1914)
Le règne de l'esprit malin (1917) / The Reign of the Evil One, translated by James Whitall (Onesuch Press, 2014)
La guérison des malades (1917)
Les signes parmi nous (1919)
Salutation paysanne (1919)
Terre du ciel (1921)
Présence de la mort (1922)
La séparation des races (1922)
Passage du poète (1923)
L'amour du monde (1925)
 Chant de notre Rhône.(1920) / Riversong of the Rhone, translated by Patti M. Marxsen (Onesuch Press, 2015)
La grande peur dans la montagne (1926) / Terror on the Mountain, translated by Milton Stansbury (Harcourt, Brace & World, 1967)
 La beauté sur la terre (1927) / Beauty on Earth, translated by Michelle Bailat-Jones (Onesuch Press, 2014)
Adam et Eve (1932)
Farinet, ou la fausse monnaie (1932)
Derborence (1934) / When the Mountain Fell, translated by Sarah Fisher Scott (Pantheon Books, 1947)
Questions (1935)
Le garçon savoyard (1936)
Taille de l'homme (1937)
Besoin de grandeur (1937)
 Si le soleil ne revenait pas... (1937) / As if the Sun were Never to Return, translated by Michelle Bailat-Jones (Onesuch Press, 2015)
Paris, notes d'un vaudois (1938)
Découverte du monde (1939)
La guerre aux papiers (1942)
René Auberjonois (1943)
Nouvelles (1944)

Awards

1927 Prix Gottfried Keller

See also 

 Swiss literature

Notes and references

External links

 Charles Ferdinand Ramuz, in the Historical Dictionary of Switzerland.
 
Biography of C.F. Ramuz
French eds. of seven feature film adaptations of novels by Ramuz

1878 births
1947 deaths
People from Lausanne
Swiss writers
University of Lausanne alumni
Swiss male novelists
Swiss writers in French